Gulebakavali may refers to:

 Gul-E-Bakawali (film), 1939 Indian Punjabi-language film
 Gulebakavali (1955 film), 1955 Indian Tamil-language film
 Gulebakavali Katha, 1962 Indian Telugu-language film 
 Gulaebaghavali, 2018 Indian Tamil-language film

See also
 The Rose of Bakawali, Indian folktale
 Hedychium, a genus of flowering plants in the ginger family Zingiberaceae
 Epiphyllum oxypetalum, a species of cactus